Golarcheh-ye Olya (also Romanized as Golārcheh-ye ‘Olyā; also known as Golārcheh-ye Bālā) is a village in Jannatabad Rural District, Salehabad County, Razavi Khorasan Province, Iran. At the 2006 census, its population was 118, in 25 families.

References 

Populated places in   Torbat-e Jam County